Feodosia City Municipality (Feodosijśka miśkrada; , Feodosijskij gorsovet), officially "the territory governed by the Feodosia city council", is one of the 25 regions of the Autonomous Republic of Crimea, a territory recognized by a majority of countries as part of Ukraine and incorporated by Russia as the Republic of Crimea. Population: 

It is a resort region, located in southeastern Crimea—one of the most popular recreational territories of the former Soviet Union. Besides its capital Feodosia, the region is famous for the resort town of Koktebel.

Administrative and municipal status
Within the framework of administrative divisions of Russia, Feodosia is, together with a number of urban and rural localities, incorporated separately as the town of republican significance of Feodosia—an administrative unit with the status equal to that of the districts. As a municipal division, the town of republican significance of Feodosia is incorporated as Feodosia Urban Okrug.

Within the framework of administrative divisions of Ukraine, Feodosia is incorporated as the town of republican significance of Feodosia. Ukraine does not have municipal divisions.

Besides the city of Feodosia, the municipality includes five towns and 12 villages which are organised into seven town and village communities.

Former names which were officially changed in 1945-49 after the deportation of Crimean Tatars and are now used only by the Crimean Tatar community are mentioned in brackets.

 Beregovoye Village Community
 Beregovoye (Qoran Eli)
 Stepnoye
 Koktebel Town Community
 Koktebel
 Nanikove (Baraq Göl)
 Nasypnoye Villagу Community
 Nasypnoye (Nasipköy)
 Blyzhnye (Bay Buğa)
 Vynogradnoye (Kürey Başı)
 Pionerskoye (Gertsenberg)
 Podgornoye
 Solnechnoye (Paşa Töpe)
 Yuzhnoye (Sultan Sala)
 Ordzhonikidze Town Community
 Ordzhonikidze (Kaygador)
 Prymorskyi Town Community
 Prymorskyi (Hafuz)
 Shchebetovka Town Community
 Shchebetovka (Otuz)
 Krasnokamyanka (Qızıltaş)
 Kurortnoye (Aşağı Otuz)

References

Notes

Sources

 
 

 
Municipalities of Crimea